Abraham Graves (born 5 October 1999) is a Surinamese professional footballer who plays as a defensive midfielder for SVB Eerste Divisie club PVV and the Suriname national team.

International career 
Graves made his debut for Suriname in a 3–1 friendly victory over Guyana on 16 March 2019.

References

External links 
 
 

1999 births
Living people
Surinamese footballers
Sportspeople from Paramaribo
Association football midfielders
S.V. Robinhood players
Politie Voetbal Vereniging players
Suriname under-20 international footballers
Suriname international footballers